Crosnoornis is a genus of suboscine bird from the Early Oligocene of Poland.

References

Prehistoric bird genera
Tyranni
Oligocene birds
Prehistoric birds of Europe
Fossil taxa described in 2021